This is a list of alleged sightings of unidentified flying objects or UFOs in France.

815

815, Lyons, Auvergne-Rhône-Alpes. The Carolingian  archbishop, Agobard of Lyons, described in his  De Grandine et Tonitruis ("On Hail and Thunder") of a "certain region called Magonia from whence come ships in the clouds", and how he prevented the stoning death of "three men and a woman who said they had fallen from these same ships."

1952 
October 17, 1952, Oloron-Sainte-Marie. Many people saw a cigar-shaped UFO accompanied by 30 disc-shaped objects. These smaller UFOs dropped a white siliceous cotton which covered tree branches and roofs. Some French skeptics thought that the UFOs were an optical phenomenon caused by the refraction of the sun's rays and the siliceous cotton was caused by a migration of field spiders.

1954 

 September 10, 1954, Quarouble, Nord. A railway worker witnessed two small beings boarding a UFO and flying into the sky. Strange things happened in the region in the following days. The case received notable media attention.

1965

 July 1, 1965, Valensole, Alpes-de-Haute-Provence. An alleged UFO sighting and close encounter by farmer Maurice Masse. According to Masse, he encountered two small beings near a spherical vehicle that had landed in a nearby field. Masse claims that he was paralyzed when one of the beings pointed a tube-like object towards him. Masse said he watched the beings looking at plants and making grunting sounds until they returned to the vehicle and flew away. According to his wife, Masse said he received some kind of communication from the beings, considered his encounter "a spiritual experience", and looked upon the site as "hallowed ground" that "should be kept in his family forever". UFOlogists consider Masse's claims significant and cite "landing gear impressions" found in the soil.

September 1965. Fort-de-France, Martinique. In late September 1965, at the harbour at Fort-de-France at 9:15 p.m., several hundred witnesses saw a ball or disk of light in the sky. It moved slowly from west to east and then looped around, leaving a glowing trail. The last part of its trajectory was observed through binoculars. It disappeared at 9:50 p.m. Reported by Michel Figuet, first timonier (helmsman) of the French fleet of the Mediterranean.

1967

 August 29, 1967, Cussac, Cantal. Two young children, a brother and sister, declare to have been the witnesses of a meeting with a UFO and their occupants.

1976
November 5, 1976. Rives / Voreppe, Isère. Dr. S., a French physicist, saw a "luminous disk moving in the sky" while driving home near Voreppe towards Grenoble. It was "was brighter than the full moon" and slightly flattened. This is GEPAN Case No. 76305443.

1978
June 19, 1978. Gujan-Mestras, Gironde. Several people witnessed a UAP which trigged off the city lights of Gujan-Mestras. The case was investigated by the local police and by GEPAN.

1981 

 January 8, 1981, Trans-en-Provence, Var. The Trans-en-Provence Case is considered by UFOlogists to be one of the rare cases where a UFO left material traces. Critics say it was a joke, and the traces were tyres.

1982 
 October 21, 1982, Nancy, France. At 12:30 a.m. an ovoid object descended into a garden and hovered above the ground. After 20 minutes the object took off silently into the sky. The witness, a biologist, reported that when the UFO rose up, the grass under it stood up straight. In the afternoon, the witness noted that two amaranth plants located near the UFO had withered leaves. The witness called the Gendarmerie, which made an inspection in the garden and took some samples of the amaranth plants. The analysis of the samples made by GEPAN found that the plants had been dehydrated, but there was no evidence of radiation.

See also 
 List of major UFO sightings

References

External links 
 CNES - UFO Data
 MUFON - Last 20 UFO Sightings and Pictures 

France
Historical events in France